The following is an incomplete list of sports stadiums in Oceania. They are ordered by their capacity, that is the maximum number of spectators the stadium can accommodate.

Currently all Oceanian stadiums with a capacity of 30,000 or more are included. The majority of these are in Australia, with the remainder in New Zealand.

Most large stadiums in Oceania are used for cricket, Australian Football, rugby union, rugby league, and association football.

List

Australia below 30,000 capacity

Australia below 30,000 capacity indoor stadiums

New Zealand below 30,000 capacity

New Zealand below 30,000 capacity indoor stadiums

Other Oceanian stadiums below 30,000 capacity

See also

Lists of stadiums by continent

List of African stadiums by capacity
List of Asian stadiums by capacity
List of European stadiums by capacity
List of North American stadiums by capacity
List of South American stadiums by capacity

Lists of stadiums worldwide

 List of association football stadiums by capacity
 List of association football stadiums by country
 List of athletics stadiums
 List of baseball stadiums by capacity
 List of basketball arenas
 List of bullrings by capacity
 List of closed stadiums by capacity
 List of covered stadiums by capacity
 List of cricket grounds by capacity
 List of future stadiums
 List of indoor arenas
 List of indoor arenas by capacity
 List of rugby league stadiums by capacity
 List of rugby union stadiums by capacity
 List of sporting venues with a highest attendance of 100,000 or more
 List of sports venues by capacity
 List of stadiums by capacity
 List of tennis stadiums by capacity

Lists of stadiums by Oceanian country

 List of sports venues in Australia
 List of football stadiums in Fiji
 List of stadiums in New Zealand
 List of stadiums in Papua New Guinea
 List of stadiums in Samoa
  List of football stadiums on the Solomon Islands
 List of stadiums in Tonga

Other

 List of stadiums in Oceania
 List of stadiums in Oceania outside Australia and New Zealand
 List of attendance figures at domestic professional sports leagues
 List of professional sports leagues by revenue

References 

fussballtempel.net

Lists of stadiums
Stadiums
Stadiums
Lists of sports venues with capacity